Universal Syncopations is an album by Czech bassist Miroslav Vitouš recorded in 2003 and released on the ECM label.

Reception 
Thom Jurek of Allmusic states "Universal Syncopations is by turns a return to not the old forms, but rather to the manner of illustrating harmonic concepts in a quintet setting that allows for a maximum space between ensemble players while turning notions of swing, counterpoint, and rhythmic invention on their heads... Universal Syncopations is one of the most gorgeous sounding and toughly played dates of the calendar year".

Track listing
All compositions by Miroslav Vitouš except as indicated.

 "Bamboo Forest" - 4:37 
 "Univoyage" - 10:54 
 "Tramp Blues" - 5:19 
 "Faith Run" - 4:58 
 "Sun Flower" - 7:21 
 "Miro Bop" - 4:03 
 "Beethoven" (Jan Garbarek, Vitouš) - 7:18 
 "Medium" (Jack DeJohnette, Vitouš) - 5:09 
 "Brazil Waves" (Garbarek, Vitouš) - 4:26

Personnel 
 Miroslav Vitouš — double bass
 Jan Garbarek — soprano saxophone, tenor saxophone
 Chick Corea — piano
 John McLaughlin — guitar
 Jack DeJohnette — drums
 Wayne Bergeron — trumpet (tracks 2-4)
 Valery Ponomarev — trumpet, flugelhorn (tracks 2-4)
 Isaac Smith — trombone (tracks 2-4)

Chart performance

References 

ECM Records albums
Miroslav Vitouš albums
2003 albums
Albums produced by Manfred Eicher